The lieutenancy areas of Scotland are the areas used for the ceremonial lord-lieutenants, the monarch's representatives, in Scotland.  The lord-lieutenants' titles chosen by the monarch and his legal advisers are mainly based on placenames of the traditional counties of Scotland. In 1794 permanent lieutenancies were established by Royal Warrant. By the Militia Act 1797 (37 Geo.3, C.103), the lieutenants appointed "for the Counties, Stewartries, Cities, and Places" were given powers to raise and command County Militia Units.

While in their lieutenancies, lord lieutenants are among the few individuals in Scotland officially permitted to fly a banner of the Royal Arms of Scotland, the "Lion Rampant" as it is more commonly known.

Lieutenancy areas are different from the current local government council areas and their committee areas. They also differ from other subdivisions of Scotland including sheriffdoms and former regions and districts.

The Lord Provosts of Aberdeen, Dundee, Edinburgh, and Glasgow also act ex officio as lord-lieutenants. This is a unique right in the United Kingdom: all other lord-lieutenants are appointed by the monarch, rather than being elected politicians.

List

Definition of the areas
Each Lord-Lieutenant of a county holding office immediately prior to the local government reorganisation of Scotland on 16 May 1975 was appointed to an area (usually the traditional county area or something very similar to it) within the regions and districts which were established on that date. The lieutenancy areas were not given names in the 1975 order transferring the lieutenancies. When local government was reorganised again on 1 April 1996, the lieutenancy areas remained essentially the same, with minor border adjustments in some based on new council area boundaries. The order transferring the lieutenancies in 1996 gave each lieutenancy a name, usually taken from the names of the pre-1975 counties which roughly correspond to the lieutenancy areas. Some lieutenancy names differ though, with the pre-1975 county of Peeblesshire now corresponding to a lieutenancy of Tweeddale.

See also
Subdivisions of Scotland
List of burghs in Scotland
List of places in Scotland

References

External links

 
 
Local government in Scotland
Lieutenancy areas
Lieutenancy areas
Administrative divisions of Scotland